Llisa (Aymara for a variety of quartz, also for a stone with a special shape used to shear llamas)   is a  mountain in the Andes of Bolivia. It is located in the Oruro Department, Sajama Province, Curahuara de Carangas Municipality. Llisa lies northeast of the Sajama volcano.

References 

Mountains of Oruro Department